Amda Iyasus (died June 1434) was Emperor of Ethiopia for one year, from 1433 to 1434. His throne name Badel Nan (Ge’ez: በድል ናኝ) and a member of the Solomonic dynasty. He was the younger son of Takla Maryam.

E. A. Wallis Budge notes that Amda Iyasus ruled for eight months, and left no children. The royal chronicles also do not relay his deeds during his brief tenure atop the throne. Al-Maqrizi was reportedly puzzled by the quick turnover in Kings.

References 

1434 deaths
15th-century emperors of Ethiopia
15th-century monarchs in Africa
Solomonic dynasty
Year of birth unknown